Milo Kendall was a successful lawyer and businessman in Princeton, Illinois, born in 1819 in Vermont. For forty years, Kendall was the attorney for the Chicago, Burlington & Quincy Railroad during a time of rapid expansion for railroad companies in the Midwest. Kendall married Orpha Ide in 1848 and had four children: Charles, Frank, William and Nell. 
Milo Kendall's career represents the growing class of lawyers defending large corporations like the railroads, while maintaining small practices that also dealt in divorce filings, debt collection and property agreements.
Milo Kendall died on December 25, 1905, after a brief illness.

External links
 Milo Kendall Papers at Newberry Library

1819 births
1905 deaths
Vermont lawyers
People from Princeton, Illinois
Illinois lawyers